Colonel George William Adolphus FitzGeorge (24 August 1843 – 2 September 1907) was a British soldier and a great-grandson of King George III of the United Kingdom.

Early life
Colonel FitzGeorge was born on 24 August 1843 in London.  He was the eldest of the three sons of the 2nd Duke of Cambridge and Louisa Fairbrother (the other sons were Admiral Sir Adolphus FitzGeorge and Colonel Sir Augustus FitzGeorge). As his parents were married in contravention of the Royal Marriages Act 1772, he was ineligible to succeed his father as Duke of Cambridge and along with his siblings did not hold royal titles.

Through his father, he was a great-grandson of King George III of the United Kingdom and first cousin to Queen Mary. Through his mother, he was a grandson of Mary Tucker, whose maiden name may have been Phillips, and John Fairbrother, a servant in Westminster.

Career
In due course, following the profession of his father, he purchased a commission in the 20th Hussars.

When the Egyptian Campaign of 1882 was undertaken he went out to Egypt on special service and was attached to the personal staff of General Sir Garnet Wolseley. He was present at the battle of Tel-el-Kebir, and brought home the despatches. His services in the campaign were mentioned in despatches, and he was awarded with the brevet of lieutenant colonel, the medal with clasp, the Fourth Class of the Osmanieh, and the Khedive's Star. He retired from the Army in 1895.

In 1887, he was the owner of the Sunday Times. At the request of Queen Victoria he sold the paper to Alice Ann Cornwell, who was an Australian gold mine owner.

Personal life
On 25 November 1885, FitzGeorge married Rosa Frederica Baring (1854–1927) in Paris. Rosa, a descendant of Sir Francis Baring of the Baring banking family, was the second daughter of William Henry Baring J.P. of Norman Court, Hants. Together, Rosa and George were the parents of three children:

 Mabel Iris FitzGeorge (1886–1976), who married Robert Balfour in 1912 and had issue (including Victor FitzGeorge-Balfour). She married secondly, to Vladimir Emmanuelovich, Prince Galitzin, in 1945.
 George Daphné FitzGeorge (1889–1954), who married Sir George Foster Earle in 1915. They divorced in 1926.
 Commander George William Frederick FitzGeorge (1892–1960), who married Esther Melina Vignon in 1915. They divorced in 1927, and he married secondly to France Bellanger in 1934. They divorced in 1957.

Colonel FitzGeorge died at the Eden-house Hotel, Lucerne on 2 September 1907 after lying ill for some weeks.

Arms
The arms of the Fitzgeorge family were: argent, on a cross between four roses gules, a sword in pale, point upwards, proper, pommel and hilt or, on a chief arched of the second, a baton fesswise.

Ancestry

References

1843 births
1907 deaths
19th-century British newspaper publishers (people)
20th Hussars officers
British Army personnel of the Anglo-Egyptian War
George FitzGeorge
Illegitimate children of British princes
Military personnel from London
The Sunday Times people